The Speaker's Committee for the Independent Parliamentary Standards Authority, or 'SCIPSA', is a body created under the Parliamentary Standards Act 2009 to scrutinise the UK's Independent Parliamentary Standards Authority. The committee's purposes are to approve the members of IPSA and to scrutinize and approve its estimate (or budget). The chair and members of IPSA are selected on an Address to the King from the House of Commons, but the names are chosen by the Speaker with the agreement of SCIPSA.

Composition 
The committee comprises eight MPs and three lay members. The MPs are: the Speaker of the House of Commons (who also serves as its chair), the Leader of the House of Commons, the chair of the Standards and Privileges Select Committee, and five others appointed by the House of Commons who are not Ministers of the Crown. The Shadow Leader of the House has been appointed as one of the opposition members of the committee since its inception, but the act creating it does not specify she will be a member and does not assign a member to be nominated by the Leader of the Opposition as is done to provide that result with the House of Commons Commission.

Membership 
The current members of SCIPSA, as of January 2022 are:

The three lay members, are, as of January 2022 are Cindy Butts, Peter Blausten, and Theresa Middleton.

See also 
 Parliamentary Committees of the United Kingdom

External links 
The '''Speaker's Committee for the Independent Parliamentary Standards Authority

References 

Committees of the British House of Commons